Irene Armstrong Wilson Kitchings (c. 1908-1975) was an African-American jazz pianist, band leader, and songwriter. She performed both as a solo act and as a band member. After transitioning to songwriting, Kitchings co-wrote "Some Other Spring", "Ghost of Yesterday", and "I'm Pulling Through", all of which were recorded by Billie Holiday.

Life and career 
Irene Kitchings was born Irene Armstrong in Marietta, Ohio. She moved to Detroit at age 13 to live with an aunt. Her mother taught her to play piano as a child.

By age 18, Kitchings was living in Chicago and performing in jazz clubs as both a solo jazz pianist and a member of various bands. She sometimes used the stage name Irene Armstrong Edie. One band led by Kitchings included musicians Budd Johnson, Walter Fuller, and Dolly Jones.

Kitchings married jazz pianist Teddy Wilson around 1931. The couple moved to New York in 1934 where Wilson joined the Benny Goodman Trio. Kitchings ceased performing after moving to New York.

Kitchings met and became friends with Billie Holiday after the two women were introduced by Wilson. After Kitchings divorced Wilson, Holiday introduced her to songwriter and composer, Arthur Herzog, Jr.. Together, Herzog and Kitchings wrote "Some Other Spring", a song that was first recorded by Holiday. Two of their other songs, "Ghost of Yesterday," and "I'm Pulling Through", were also recorded by Holiday.

Kitchings, who suffered from Eale's Disease, fell ill and moved to Cleveland to stay with an aunt. While in Cleveland, she met and married Elden Kitchings, learned to play the organ, and became active in her church.

Death and legacy 
Kitchings died in 1975.

Writers and historians often confuse Kitchings with Irene Higgenbotham, an African-American songwriter and pianist who also wrote songs that were performed by Billie Holiday.

Jazz vocalist Carmen McRae credited Kitchings as a mentor.

References

External links 
Some Other Spring, written by A. Herzog and I. Kitchings as performed by Billie Holiday

African-American jazz composers
African-American jazz musicians
Women jazz pianists
1900s births
1975 deaths
American jazz pianists
American jazz composers
African-American pianists
20th-century African-American people